Jeju World Cup Stadium is a football stadium with a 35,657-person capacity that is located in the city of Seogwipo on the South Korean Jeju Province and is the home of Jeju United. The design of the stadium which is in the shape of mouth of a volcano is based on Jeju Island's natural environment and its sea surroundings. The roof of Jeju World Cup Stadium is in the form of nets of traditional fishing boats in Jeju. Jeju hosted several matches of the 2002 FIFA World Cup, after which about 7,000 changeable seats on the upper eastern stand were transferred to the Gangchanghak Practice Stadium, making the total seating capacity in the main stadium 35,657. It also hosted some matches of the 2017 FIFA U-20 World Cup.

2002 FIFA World Cup matches

References

External links

 Jeju United Official website 
 World Stadiums 

Football venues in South Korea
2002 FIFA World Cup stadiums in South Korea
Sport in Jeju Province
Jeju United FC
Buildings and structures in Jeju Province
Sports venues completed in 2001
K League 1 stadiums
K League 2 stadiums